Risna Prahalabenta Ranggalelana (born 9 April 1997) is an Indonesian professional footballer who plays as a centre-back for Liga 1 club Barito Putera.

Club career

Persik Kediri 
In 2017 Risna Prahalabenta joined Persik Kediri in the Liga 2. On 25 November 2019 Persik successfully won the 2019 Liga 2 Final and promoted to Liga 1, after defeated Persita Tangerang 3–2 at the Kapten I Wayan Dipta Stadium, Gianyar.

Persekat Tegal (loan)
He was signed for Persekat Tegal to play in Liga 3 Regional route: Central Java in the 2018 season, on loan from Persik Kediri.

Madura United
In 2020 Risna signed with Madura United for the 2020 Liga 1 (Indonesia). He made his league debut on 29 February 2020, in a 4–0 win against Barito Putera as substitute at the Gelora Madura Stadium, Pamekasan. Then this season was suspended on 27 March 2020 due to the COVID-19 pandemic. The season was abandoned and was declared void on 20 January 2021.

Return to Persik Kediri
On 23 April 2021, it was confirmed that Risna would re-join Persik Kediri, signing a year contract. He made his league debut on 27 August 2021, in a 1–0 loss against Bali United as substitute at the Gelora Bung Karno Stadium, Jakarta.

Dewa United
Risna was signed for Dewa United to play in Liga 1 in the 2022–23 season. He made his league debut on 25 July 2022 in a match against Persis Solo at the Moch. Soebroto Stadium, Magelang.

Honours

Club 
Persik Kediri
 Liga 3: 2018
 Liga 2: 2019

References

External links
 Risna Prahalabenta at Soccerway
 Risna Prahalabenta at Liga Indonesia

1997 births
Living people
Indonesian footballers
Persik Kediri players
Madura United F.C. players
Dewa United F.C. players
Liga 1 (Indonesia) players
Liga 2 (Indonesia) players
People from Kediri (city)
Association football defenders
Sportspeople from East Java
21st-century Indonesian people